Včelákov is a market town in Chrudim District in the Pardubice Region of the Czech Republic. It has about 600 inhabitants.

Administrative parts
Villages of Bystřice, Dolní Babákov, Hůrka, Příkrakov, Střítež and Vyhnánov are administrative parts of Včelákov.

References

External links

Market towns in the Czech Republic
Populated places in Chrudim District